Brad Staats (age 43) is the unsuccessful 2012 Republican candidate for Tennessee's 5th Congressional District.  He ran on a "family matters" platform that stressed traditional values and Second Amendment rights.  He drew national attention in Oct-2012 after posting a photo of his handgun to his Facebook page, alongside a message "welcoming" President Barack Obama to Tennessee.

He lost to Democratic incumbent Rep. Jim Cooper by a margin of about 85,000 votes, or more than 30 percent of the total vote.

Arrest
Staats was arrested early on the morning of 25-Nov-2012 on a domestic assault charge after police responded to a call from his wife claiming that he slapped her.  He was booked into Davidson County Jail.  He posted a $5,000 bond and was later released.  His trial date was set for 7-Feb-2013.  He reached a plea bargain and pleaded guilty to disorderly conduct.

On 3-Mar-2013, he was arrested again in Panama City, Florida. According to the Bay County Sheriff's Office and Clerk of the Court, he was arrested for interfering with an emergency situation (traffic accident) and resisting arrest without violence. He was released on his own recognise and a trial scheduled 7-July-2013. On 4-June-2013, the case was dropped against him.

Personal life

Brad Staats was born in Bay County, Florida, and currently resides in Nashville, Tennessee.  He received a B.A. degree in English literature from Oral Roberts University with a second degree in music.  He has appeared on Broadway and in touring companies with "The Phantom of the Opera", "Evita", and "Smokey Joe’s Cafe".  After leaving show business, he founded ConsulTel, a wholesale security distribution company located in Hermitage, Tennessee.  His family attends Cornerstone Church in Madison, Tennessee.  He opposes abortion and same-sex marriage.  Staats and his wife, Bethany, have four children.

References

External links
 Brad Staats for Congress (campaign website)
 staats4congress (Facebook page)
 Staats4Congress (Twitter account)
 BradStaats (YouTube channel)

Tennessee Republicans
Oral Roberts University alumni
Living people
People from Bay County, Florida
Year of birth missing (living people)